Pontibacter diazotrophicus  is a nitrogen-fixing, Gram-negative and rod-shaped bacterium from the genus of Pontibacter which has been isolated from sand from the Taklamakan Desert, China.

References 

Cytophagia
Bacteria described in 2014